Khin Maung Lay (born 21 September 1940) is a Burmese footballer. He competed in the men's tournament at the 1972 Summer Olympics.

References

External links
 

1940 births
Living people
Burmese footballers
Myanmar international footballers
Olympic footballers of Myanmar
Footballers at the 1972 Summer Olympics
Place of birth missing (living people)
Association football forwards
Competitors at the 1971 Southeast Asian Peninsular Games
Southeast Asian Games gold medalists for Myanmar
Southeast Asian Games medalists in football
Asian Games medalists in football
Asian Games gold medalists for Myanmar
Medalists at the 1966 Asian Games
Footballers at the 1966 Asian Games